JumpSoft Inc is an American software company that provides application performance management (APM) software. JumpSoft is a committee member for several industry web services standards including web services interoperability and cloud application management for platforms. In 2012 JumpSoft co-proposed a new industry web services standard for managing cloud applications on PaaS environments called CAMP.

Open Standards Development

Cloud Application Management for Platforms (CAMP)
CAMP is an open web services standard under development as an API for managing public and private cloud applications. In 2012 JumpSoft co-proposed CAMP through the Organization for the Advancement of Structured Information Standards (OASIS).

CAMP leveraged similarities between commercial and open-source PaaS products to attempt a simple API that is language-, framework-, and platform-agnostic as an alternative to closed APIs from cloud services vendors. Using CAMP, companies can migrate their cloud applications from one PaaS vendor to another by mapping the requirements of applications to the specific capabilities of the underlying platform.

Joab Jackson of IDG News Service said "CAMP is the first attempt, as far as the development team knows, to standardize PaaS control commands. Although the use of PaaS services has grown dramatically in the past few years, through services like Amazon's Elastic Cloud Compute (EC2) and Microsoft Azure, each vendor offers its own console to users, making the migration of workloads from one service to the next difficult."

The other organizations that proposed CAMP include Oracle, Redhat, Software AG and the US Department of Defense.

Web Services Interoperability (WS-I)
JumpSoft is a sponsor member for the OASIS Web Services Interoperability (WS-I) technical committee.

Products and Services

JumpCenter
JumpCenter is a systems management product for application assurance. The product provides command and control for COTS and custom applications from a central dashboard and automates resiliency and recovery for failed processes or based on events through its Dynamix engine technology. JumpCenter provides application management for COTS applications such as PeopleSoft.

References

External links
 JumpSoft Inc website
 JumpCenter Application Management

Software performance management
Companies based in Reston, Virginia
Software companies based in Virginia
American companies established in 2009
Software companies established in 2009
Software companies of the United States
2009 establishments in Virginia
Website monitoring software